The St Helens trolleybus system once served St Helens, Merseyside, north west England.

By the standards of the various now-defunct trolleybus systems in the United Kingdom, the St Helens system was a medium-sized one, with a total of six routes, and a maximum fleet of 66 trolleybuses. The 16 youngest trolleybuses in the fleet at that time, ones built in 1950–51, were all sold to other systems for further use. Eight Sunbeam vehicles went to South Shields system and eight British United Traction vehicles to Bradford.

Only one of the former St Helens system trolleybuses is now preserved, at the Trolleybus Museum at Sandtoft, South Yorkshire.

See also

History of St Helens, Merseyside
Transport in St Helens
List of trolleybus systems in the United Kingdom

References

Notes

Further reading

External links

SCT'61 website - photos and descriptions of St Helens trolleybuses and early motorbuses
National Trolleybus Archive
British Trolleybus Society, based in Reading
National Trolleybus Association, based in London

History of St Helens, Merseyside
Transport in St Helens, Merseyside
St Helens
St Helens